The men's pole vault at the 2015 World Championships in Athletics was held at the Beijing National Stadium on 22 and 24 August.

Competition
World record holder and world leader Renaud Lavillenie set his opening height at 5.80, after most of the field had already attempted two heights.  He cleared it with one foot to spare on his first attempt.   It is believed to be the highest opening height ever attempted.  At the end of that round, only six jumpers remained and three others, Shawnacy Barber, Piotr Lisek and 2011 winner Paweł Wojciechowski also had no misses. Returning champion Raphael Holzdeppe also was one of the six to clear 5.80, including several misses.

At the next height, 5.90, Lavillenie cleared the bar easily, but in the wrong position.  Each time he knocked it off on his way down. Barber, the National High School Record holder and NCAA Champion from the University of Akron, cleared on his first attempt. On his last attempt Holzdeppe cleared 5.90 to stay in the competition, leaving a three-way tie for the bronze medal between Wojciechowski, Lisek, and Lavillenie.	
 
Barber and Holzdeppe competed for the gold medal at a height of 6.00; both athletes failed to clear it on all three attempts, neither really getting off a serious attempt. Barber's initial success at 5.90 in the previous round gave him the gold medal over Holzdeppe.

Records
Prior to the competition, the records were as follows:

Qualification standards

Schedule

Results

Qualification
Qualification: 5.70 m (Q) or at least 12 best performers (q).

Final
The final was started at 19:05.

References

Pole vault
Pole vault at the World Athletics Championships